The first season of the American television series Whose Line Is It Anyway? premiered on ABC on August 5, 1998, and concluded on March 24, 1999.

Cast

Recurring 
 Wayne Brady (16 episodes)
 Brad Sherwood (eight episodes)
 Greg Proops (seven episodes)
 Denny Siegel (five episodes)
 Karen Maruyama (one episode)
 Kathy Kinney (one episode)
 Ian Gomez (one episode)
 Stephen Colbert (one episode)

Episodes 

"Winner(s)" of each episode as chosen by host Drew Carey are highlighted in italics. The winner would take his or her seat and call a sketch for Drew to perform (often with the help of the rest).

References

External links
Whose Line Is It Anyway? (U.S.) (a Titles & Air Dates Guide)
Mark's guide to Whose Line is it Anyway? - Episode Guide

Whose Line Is It Anyway?
1998 American television seasons
1999 American television seasons